Single-precision floating-point format (sometimes called FP32 or float32) is a computer number format, usually occupying 32 bits in computer memory; it represents a wide dynamic range of numeric values by using a floating radix point.

A floating-point variable can represent a wider range of numbers than a fixed-point variable of the same bit width at the cost of precision. A signed 32-bit integer variable has a maximum value of 231 − 1 = 2,147,483,647, whereas an IEEE 754 32-bit base-2 floating-point variable has a maximum value of (2 − 2−23) × 2127 ≈ 3.4028235 × 1038. All integers with 7 or fewer decimal digits, and any 2n for a whole number −149 ≤ n ≤ 127, can be converted exactly into an IEEE 754 single-precision floating-point value.

In the IEEE 754-2008 standard, the 32-bit base-2 format is officially referred to as binary32; it was called single in IEEE 754-1985. IEEE 754 specifies additional floating-point types, such as 64-bit base-2 double precision and, more recently, base-10 representations.

One of the first programming languages to provide single- and double-precision floating-point data types was Fortran. Before the widespread adoption of IEEE 754-1985, the representation and properties of floating-point data types depended on the computer manufacturer and computer model, and upon decisions made by programming-language designers. E.g., GW-BASIC's single-precision data type was the 32-bit MBF floating-point format.

Single precision is termed REAL in Fortran, SINGLE-FLOAT in Common Lisp, float in C, C++, C#, Java, Float in Haskell and Swift, and Single in Object Pascal (Delphi), Visual Basic, and MATLAB. However, float in Python, Ruby, PHP, and OCaml and single in versions of Octave before 3.2 refer to double-precision numbers. In most implementations of PostScript, and some embedded systems, the only supported precision is single.

IEEE 754 standard: binary32
The IEEE 754 standard specifies a binary32 as having:
 Sign bit: 1 bit
 Exponent width: 8 bits
 Significand precision: 24 bits (23 explicitly stored)

This gives from 6 to 9 significant decimal digits precision. If a decimal string with at most 6 significant digits is converted to the IEEE 754 single-precision format, giving a normal number, and then converted back to a decimal string with the same number of digits, the final result should match the original string. If an IEEE 754 single-precision number is converted to a decimal string with at least 9 significant digits, and then converted back to single-precision representation, the final result must match the original number.

The sign bit determines the sign of the number, which is the sign of the significand as well. The exponent is an 8-bit unsigned integer from 0 to 255, in biased form: an exponent value of 127 represents the actual zero. Exponents range from −126 to +127 because exponents of −127 (all 0s) and +128 (all 1s) are reserved for special numbers.

The true significand includes 23 fraction bits to the right of the binary point and an implicit leading bit (to the left of the binary point) with value 1, unless the exponent is stored with all zeros. Thus only 23 fraction bits of the significand appear in the memory format, but the total precision is 24 bits (equivalent to log10(224) ≈ 7.225 decimal digits). The bits are laid out as follows:

The real value assumed by a given 32-bit binary32 data with a given sign, biased exponent e (the 8-bit unsigned integer), and a 23-bit fraction is
 ,
which yields
 

In this example:
 ,
 ,
 ,
 ,
 .
thus:
 .

Note:
 ,
 ,
 ,
 .

Exponent encoding
The single-precision binary floating-point exponent is encoded using an offset-binary representation, with the zero offset being 127; also known as exponent bias in the IEEE 754 standard.
 Emin = 01H−7FH = −126
 Emax = FEH−7FH = 127
 Exponent bias = 7FH = 127

Thus, in order to get the true exponent as defined by the offset-binary representation, the offset of 127 has to be subtracted from the stored exponent.

The stored exponents 00H and FFH are interpreted specially.

Converting decimal to binary32

In general, refer to the IEEE 754 standard itself for the strict conversion (including the rounding behaviour) of a real number into its equivalent binary32 format.

Here we can show how to convert a base-10 real number into an IEEE 754 binary32 format using the following outline:
 Consider a real number with an integer and a fraction part such as 12.375
 Convert and normalize the integer part into binary
 Convert the fraction part using the following technique as shown here
 Add the two results and adjust them to produce a proper final conversion

Conversion of the fractional part:
Consider 0.375, the fractional part of 12.375. To convert it into a binary fraction, multiply the fraction by 2, take the integer part and repeat with the new fraction by 2 until a fraction of zero is found or until the precision limit is reached which is 23 fraction digits for IEEE 754 binary32 format.

 , the integer part represents the binary fraction digit. Re-multiply 0.750 by 2 to proceed

 

 , fraction = 0.011, terminate

Not all decimal fractions can be represented in a finite digit binary fraction. For example, decimal 0.1 cannot be represented in binary exactly, only approximated. Therefore:

 

Since IEEE 754 binary32 format requires real values to be represented in  format (see Normalized number, Denormalized number), 1100.011 is shifted to the right by 3 digits to become 

Finally we can see that: 

From which we deduce:
 The exponent is 3 (and in the biased form it is therefore 
 The fraction is 100011 (looking to the right of the binary point)

From these we can form the resulting 32-bit IEEE 754 binary32 format representation of 12.375:

 

Note: consider converting 68.123 into IEEE 754 binary32 format: Using the above procedure you expect to get  with the last 4 bits being 1001.

Example 1:
Consider decimal 1. We can see that: 

From which we deduce:
 The exponent is 0 (and in the biased form it is therefore 
 The fraction is 0 (looking to the right of the binary point in 1.0 is all )

From these we can form the resulting 32-bit IEEE 754 binary32 format representation of real number 1:

 

Example 2:
Consider a value 0.25. We can see that: 

From which we deduce:
 The exponent is −2 (and in the biased form it is )
 The fraction is 0 (looking to the right of binary point in 1.0 is all zeroes)

From these we can form the resulting 32-bit IEEE 754 binary32 format representation of real number 0.25:

 

Example 3:
Consider a value of 0.375. We saw that 

Hence after determining a representation of 0.375 as  we can proceed as above:
 The exponent is −2 (and in the biased form it is )
 The fraction is 1 (looking to the right of binary point in 1.1 is a single )

From these we can form the resulting 32-bit IEEE 754 binary32 format representation of real number 0.375:

Converting binary32 to decimal

If the binary32 value,  in this example, is in hexadecimal we first convert it to binary:

 

then we break it down into three parts: sign bit, exponent, and significand.
 Sign bit: 
 Exponent: 
 Significand: 

We then add the implicit 24th bit to the significand:
 Significand: 

and decode the exponent value by subtracting 127:
 Raw exponent: 
 Decoded exponent: 

Each of the 24 bits of the significand (including the implicit 24th bit), bit 23 to bit 0, represents a value, starting at 1 and halves for each bit, as follows:

 bit 23 = 1
 bit 22 = 0.5
 bit 21 = 0.25
 bit 20 = 0.125
 bit 19 = 0.0625
 bit 18 = 0.03125
 bit 17 = 0.015625
 .
 .
 bit 6 = 0.00000762939453125
 bit 5 = 0.000003814697265625
 bit 4 = 0.0000019073486328125
 bit 3 = 0.00000095367431640625
 bit 2 = 0.000000476837158203125
 bit 1 = 0.0000002384185791015625
 bit 0 = 0.00000011920928955078125

The significand in this example has three bits set: bit 23, bit 22, and bit 19. We can now decode the significand by adding the values represented by these bits.
 Decoded significand: 

Then we need to multiply with the base, 2, to the power of the exponent, to get the final result:

 

Thus
 

This is equivalent to:
 

Precision limitations on decimal values (between 1 and 16777216)
 Decimals between 1 and 2: fixed interval 2−23 (1+2−23 is the next largest float after 1)
 Decimals between 2 and 4: fixed interval 2−22
 Decimals between 4 and 8: fixed interval 2−21
 ...
 Decimals between 2n and 2n+1: fixed interval 2n-23
 ...
 Decimals between 222=4194304 and 223=8388608: fixed interval 2−1=0.5
 Decimals between 223=8388608 and 224=16777216: fixed interval 20=1

Precision limitations on integer values
 Integers between 0 and 16777216 can be exactly represented (also applies for negative integers between −16777216 and 0)
 Integers between 224=16777216 and 225=33554432 round to a multiple of 2 (even number)
 Integers between 225 and 226 round to a multiple of 4
 ...
 Integers between 2n and 2n+1 round to a multiple of 2n-23
 ...
 Integers between 2127 and 2128 round to a multiple of 2104
 Integers greater than or equal to 2128 are rounded to "infinity".

Notable single-precision cases
These examples are given in bit representation, in hexadecimal and binary, of the floating-point value. This includes the sign, (biased) exponent, and significand.

 0 00000000 000000000000000000000012 = 0000 000116 = 2−126 × 2−23 = 2−149 ≈ 1.4012984643 × 10−45
                                                    (smallest positive subnormal number)

 0 00000000 111111111111111111111112 = 007f ffff16 = 2−126 × (1 − 2−23) ≈ 1.1754942107 ×10−38
                                                    (largest subnormal number)

 0 00000001 000000000000000000000002 = 0080 000016 = 2−126 ≈ 1.1754943508 × 10−38
                                                    (smallest positive normal number)

 0 11111110 111111111111111111111112 = 7f7f ffff16 = 2127 × (2 − 2−23) ≈ 3.4028234664 × 1038
                                                    (largest normal number)

 0 01111110 111111111111111111111112 = 3f7f ffff16 = 1 − 2−24 ≈ 0.999999940395355225
                                                    (largest number less than one)

 0 01111111 000000000000000000000002 = 3f80 000016 = 1 (one)

 0 01111111 000000000000000000000012 = 3f80 000116 = 1 + 2−23 ≈ 1.00000011920928955
                                                    (smallest number larger than one)

 1 10000000 000000000000000000000002 = c000 000016 = −2
 0 00000000 000000000000000000000002 = 0000 000016 = 0
 1 00000000 000000000000000000000002 = 8000 000016 = −0
                                    
 0 11111111 000000000000000000000002 = 7f80 000016 = infinity
 1 11111111 000000000000000000000002 = ff80 000016 = −infinity
                                    
 0 10000000 100100100001111110110112 = 4049 0fdb16 ≈ 3.14159274101257324 ≈ π ( pi )
 0 01111101 010101010101010101010112 = 3eaa aaab16 ≈ 0.333333343267440796 ≈ 1/3
                                    
 x 11111111 100000000000000000000012 = ffc0 000116 = qNaN (on x86 and ARM processors)
 x 11111111 000000000000000000000012 = ff80 000116 = sNaN (on x86 and ARM processors)

By default, 1/3 rounds up, instead of down like double precision, because of the even number of bits in the significand. The bits of 1/3 beyond the rounding point are 1010... which is more than 1/2 of a unit in the last place.

Encodings of qNaN and sNaN are not specified in IEEE 754 and implemented differently on different processors. The x86 family and the ARM family processors use the most significant bit of the significand field to indicate a quiet NaN. The PA-RISC processors use the bit to indicate a signalling NaN.

Optimizations
The design of floating-point format allows various optimisations, resulting from the easy generation of a base-2 logarithm approximation from an integer view of the raw bit pattern. Integer arithmetic and bit-shifting can yield an approximation to reciprocal square root (fast inverse square root), commonly required in computer graphics.

See also
 IEEE 754
 ISO/IEC 10967, language independent arithmetic
 Primitive data type
 Numerical stability
 Scientific notation

References

External links
 Live floating-point bit pattern editor
 Online calculator
 Online converter for IEEE 754 numbers with single precision
 C source code to convert between IEEE double, single, and half precision

Binary arithmetic
Computer arithmetic
Floating point types